"Nichts bleibt für die Ewigkeit" (Nothing remains for eternity) is a song by Die Toten Hosen. It's the first single and the sixth track from the album Opium fürs Volk.

Lyrically the song is a reminder of how time goes by fast and that people think too much about future.

The cover of the single shows a detail of a painting by Andrea Mantegna, "Lamentation over the Dead Christ", which can be seen as an illustration to the lyrics.

On the album, the song is followed by a dub track "Ewig währt am längsten", which is a continuation or a reprise of "Nichts bleibt für die Ewigkeit".

Music video
The music video was directed by Hans Neleman. This is one of the most expensive DTH music videos.

It's shown mostly in black & white and shows an eerie atmosphere with creepy images. At the start, a fresh cow head is shown decaying till only dust is left. Campino is singing in a cage, that holds his head still. Throughout the video, ominous figures are seen. Also a skull with wings plays an important role.

Track listing
 "Nichts bleibt für die Ewigkeit" (single edit) (von Holst, Frege/Müller, von Holst, Frege) − 3:54
 "Alkohol" (Alcohol) (Rohde/Frege) − 2:03
 "Prominentenpsychose" (Celebrity psychosis) (Frege/Frege) – 3:14
 "Die '7' ist alles" (The '7' is everything) (Meurer/Frege) − 5:12

Charts

1995 singles
Die Toten Hosen songs
Songs written by Campino (singer)
Songs written by Andreas von Holst